Jessica S. Dickson (born September 6, 1984) is an American former professional basketball player who was drafted by the Houston Comets in the 2007 WNBA Draft.

High school
Dickson is Vanguard High Schools all-time leader in points scored girls or boys (2,634 career points)
led her team to the FHSAA State Final Four in 2002 & 2003.

College
Dickson is the University of South Florida women's basketball all-time leader in points scored. She is a member of the USF Athletic Hall of Fame.

South Florida statistics

Source

Personal life
Dickson started Jessica Dickson 4 Kid Inc, a nonprofit organization that helps children in need.

References

External links
WNBA.com: Meet South Florida Guard Jessica Dickson
USF bio

1984 births
Living people
American women's basketball players
Basketball players from Gainesville, Florida
South Florida Bulls women's basketball players
Forwards (basketball)